is a Japanese weightlifter. He competed in the men's featherweight event at the 1996 Summer Olympics.

References

1972 births
Living people
Japanese male weightlifters
Olympic weightlifters of Japan
Weightlifters at the 1996 Summer Olympics
Sportspeople from Hokkaido